Big Ditch Wildlife Management Area is a protected area located in Webster County, West Virginia near the town of Cowen.

Directions

Hunting and Trapping
Activities include fishing for warm water species like largemouth bass, crappie, and channel catfish and picnics. Small game, waterfowl and bow hunting is permitted seasonally.

See also
 Animal conservation
 Hunting
 List of West Virginia wildlife management areas
 Recreational fishing

References

External links
 West Virginia Division of Natural Resources web site
 West Virginia Hunting Regulations
 West Virginia Fishing Regulations

Wildlife management areas of West Virginia
Protected areas of Webster County, West Virginia
IUCN Category V